Mitella caulescens, the slightstemmed miterwort, star-shaped mitrewort, leafy miterwort, or creeping miterwort, is an herbaceous perennial flowering plant in the family Saxifragaceae native to western North America.

References

External links

Jepson Manual Treatment
Photo gallery

caulescens
Flora of British Columbia
Flora of the Western United States
Flora without expected TNC conservation status